Thomas Rukavina (August 23, 1950 – January 7, 2019) was an American politician and a Democratic–Farmer–Labor (DFL) member of the Minnesota House of Representatives from 1987 to 2013. In 2010 he was an unsuccessful candidate for Governor of Minnesota, seeking the DFL nomination. He was a St. Louis County commissioner from 2015 to 2018.

Early life
Rukavina was born in Virginia, Minnesota, of Croatian and Italian descent, and graduated from the University of Minnesota Duluth with a Bachelor of Arts degree cum laude in political science. He first held elected office in the 1970s on the Virginia school board and the Pike Town Board. Before becoming a full-time legislator, he worked in various positions, including at the Minntac taconite plant, as a logger and a naturalist at the Ironworld Discovery Center in Chisholm, Minnesota, and as an assistant director at Giants Ridge Ski Area.

Minnesota House of Representatives
Rukavina was a member of the Minnesota House of Representatives for thirteen terms, serving from 1987 to 2013. He represented District 5A, which included the Mesabi Range in St. Louis County in northeastern Minnesota. In 2012, he announced he would not seek reelection, citing his frustration with the partisan atmosphere at the state Capitol.

Rukavina proposed a bill that would ban the sale of foreign-made American flags in Minnesota. The bill later passed into law.

In 2009, Rukavina opposed allowing the University of Minnesota to sell beer and wine only in premium seats at TCF Bank Stadium. He insisted that the University alter its policy to sell alcohol to all legal drinkers throughout the stadium, including its own students.

2010 gubernatorial campaign

On July 23, 2009, Rukavina filed paperwork for an exploratory committee for Governor of Minnesota, making his candidacy official in early September at Bayfront Park in Duluth. He was later endorsed by Congressman Jim Oberstar. At the DFL state convention he dropped out of the race and endorsed Margaret Anderson Kelliher.

Personal life
Rukavina was arrested on July 31, 2004, for fourth-degree drunk driving with a blood alcohol level of 0.15. He pleaded guilty to the charge.

Rukavina was married to Jean and the couple had two children. Rukavina's daughter Ida worked for U.S. Senator Amy Klobuchar. Ida Rukavina was then Executive Director of the Range Association of Municipalites and Schools (RAMS) starting in July of 2021 before being appointed by MN Governor Tim Walz as the new commissioner of Iron Range Resources and Rehabilitation Board in December 2022.  He was friends with late U.S. Senator Paul Wellstone, who was flying to attend the funeral of Rukavina's father when his plane fatally crashed in October 2002.

Death
Rukavina died of leukemia on January 7, 2019, at the University of Minnesota Medical Center in Minneapolis, aged 68.

In response to his death, Governor Tim Walz said: "There's folks who put their life into serving Minnesota, and Tom Rukavina was one of those". U.S. Senator Klobuchar said that: "Rukavina understood the dignity of hard work, and was a force for Iron Range workers and their families". Minnesota Attorney General Keith Ellison remembered Rukavina as a "friend, public servant, and a fierce defender of working people" on a statement on Twitter.

Legacy 
The Thomas Rukavina Memorial Bridge was named after him after a bill introduced by Dave Tomassoni was passed by the Minnesota legislature. The bridge is located in the Bridgeview Pocket Park on the Mesabi Trail. A public ceremony was held on August 19, 2021, after the bridge was renamed. Guests at the ceremony included U.S. senator Amy Klobuchar.

References

External links

Project Vote Smart - Rep. Tom Rukavina Profile
Follow the Money - Thomas Rukavina Campaign Contributions
Rep. Rukavina Campaign Web Site
Rukavina for Governor, 2010 web site

1950 births
2019 deaths
People from Virginia, Minnesota
University of Minnesota Duluth alumni
American people of Croatian descent
County commissioners in Minnesota
Minnesota city council members
School board members in Minnesota
Democratic Party members of the Minnesota House of Representatives
21st-century American politicians
Deaths from cancer in Minnesota
Deaths from leukemia
Candidates in the 2010 United States elections